Events from the year 1459 in Ireland.

Incumbent
Lord: Henry VI

Events
Richard Duke of York, Lord Lieutenant of Ireland, returns on a second visit to Ireland.
Irish Parliament, meeting at Drogheda, upholds Richard Duke of York's  authority against Henry VI and an English Act of Attainder.

Births
 James FitzGerald, 8th Earl of Desmond

Deaths
Edmund Oldhall, an English-born cleric and judge in fifteenth-century Ireland. He was Bishop of Meath and acting Lord Chancellor of Ireland. He was a brother of the leading Yorkist statesman Sir William Oldhall.

References

 
1450s in Ireland
Ireland
Years of the 15th century in Ireland